Wat Manorom is a major Buddhist temple and monastery in Luang Prabang, Laos. 

There are several theories as to the date of its founding; it may have been  founded in 1372 or 1375 by Samsenthai, but it may also date from the reign of Laasaenthai Bouvanaat around 1492.  The great bronze Buddha, 6 meters high, in the nave dates from the 1370s.

External links
Asian Historical Architecture: Wat Manorom

1372 establishments in Asia
Buddhist temples in Laos
Buildings and structures in Luang Prabang
14th-century Buddhist temples